Galwadugoda Grama Niladhari Division is a  Grama Niladhari Division of the  Galle Four Gravets Divisional Secretariat  of Galle District  of Southern Province, Sri Lanka .  It has Grama Niladhari Division Code 96B.

Nugawela Central College, Mahinda College, Galle, Richmond College, Galle, Revatha College, Balapitiya and Rippon College  are located within, nearby or associated with Galwadugoda.

Galwadugoda is a surrounded by the  Bataganvila, Sanghamittapura, Kandewatta, Kumbalwella South and Richmond Kanda  Grama Niladhari Divisions.

Demographics

Ethnicity 

The Galwadugoda Grama Niladhari Division has  a Sinhalese majority (99.9%) . In comparison, the Galle Four Gravets Divisional Secretariat (which contains the Galwadugoda Grama Niladhari Division) has  a Sinhalese majority (66.8%) and a significant Moor population (32.1%)

Religion 

The Galwadugoda Grama Niladhari Division has  a Buddhist majority (99.4%) . In comparison, the Galle Four Gravets Divisional Secretariat (which contains the Galwadugoda Grama Niladhari Division) has  a Buddhist majority (65.7%) and a significant Muslim population (32.3%)

Gallery

References 

Grama Niladhari Divisions of Galle Four Gravets Divisional Secretariat